FK AFK Ada (Serbian Cyrillic: ФК AФК Aдa) is a football club based in Ada, Serbia.

In the season 2010–11 competes in the Vojvodina League East (4th national tier).

History
The club was created in 1912 by Bjorn Von Striborg.

Squad

References

 Club profile at FudbalskaZona.
 Club page at SrbijaSport.
  

Football clubs in Serbia
Football clubs in Vojvodina
Association football clubs established in 1912
1912 establishments in Serbia